Andrew Skarbek (born 1967 or 1968) is an Australian game show contestant who became the first and only person to win the top prize of $1,000,000 on Australian TV game show Million Dollar Minute. In a show record run of 23 nights, Skarbek defeated over 40 contestants, rejected over $150,000 in safe money and answered nearly 600 questions correctly to win the top prize on the episode aired on 27 March 2015.

References

Living people
Contestants on Australian game shows
Year of birth uncertain
Year of birth missing (living people)